John Griffith McCullough (September 16, 1835 – May 29, 1915) was an American state legislator, businessperson and attorney. He served as Attorney General of California during the Civil War, and the 49th governor of Vermont from 1902 to 1904.

Early life
John G. McCullough was born on September 16, 1835, in Newark, Delaware, to Albert and Rebecca (Griffith) McCullough. His father was Scotch-Irish, and his mother Welsh. An ancestor on his mother's side had fought in Oliver Cromwell's army.

His father died when he was three years old, and his mother four years later. Relatives and family friends took him in, and provided him with a private school education.

He attended Delaware College, and graduated first in his class with an AB degree after just two years of schooling. He clerked in the law firm of St. George Tucker Campbell in Philadelphia, Pennsylvania, while attending the University of Pennsylvania Law School, and graduated with an LL.B. in 1858, and was admitted to the bar of the Pennsylvania Supreme Court. After a heart attack he was advised to seek a warmer climate. He sailed to California, where he took up the practice of law in Mariposa, California. He was admitted to the bar of the California Supreme Court.

California years
McCullough supported General Edwin Vose Sumner when the Union general seized Fort Alcatraz in 1861, preventing Colonel Albert Sidney Johnston from using the fort in support of bringing California into the American Civil War on the side of the Confederacy.

His public speech-making in support of Sumner led to his election to the California State Assembly the same year.  He was re-elected in 1862. In 1863, he was elected Attorney General, but lost re-election in 1867. He moved to San Francisco, where he established a lucrative legal practice.

Move to Vermont and governorship
He moved to Vermont in 1873, where he devoted himself to business.  He had married Eliza Hall Park, daughter of Panama Railway president Trenor W. Park, on August 30, 1871. The couple had four children: a son, Hall Park McCullough, and daughters Elizabeth Laura McCullough, Ella Sarah "Sallie" McCullough, and Esther Morgan McCullough.

His father-in-law appointed him vice-president and general manager of the Panama Railway. After Park's death in 1882, he became the railroad's president. He helped reorganize the Erie Railroad in 1884 and 1893, becoming chairman of the company's executive committee. He was president of the Bennington and Rutland Railway from 1883 to 1900, and president of the Chicago and Erie Railroad from 1890 to 1900.

A lifelong Republican, McCullough was very active in politics.  He was elected a delegate to the Republican National Convention in 1880, 1888 and 1900, being elected chairman of the delegation in 1900. He was elected to the Vermont State Senate in 1898, and elected president pro tempore.

McCullough was elected Governor of Vermont in 1902. During his administration, Vermont abandoned statewide prohibition in favor of a local option law.

Later life
After leaving the governorship, McCullough became active in business again.  He was president or a director of the First National Bank of North Bennington, the Bank of New York, the Fidelity & Casualty Co., National Life Insurance Company of Vermont, Hudson and Manhattan Railroad, Central Vermont Railroad, Atchison, Topeka and Santa Fe Railroad, and the Lackawanna Steel Company.

He received honorary Doctor of Laws degrees from Middlebury College in 1900, the University of Vermont in 1904, and Norwich University in 1905.

McCullough died in New York City on May 29, 1915. He is interred in the family vault at Bennington's Old First Church Cemetery.

Notable placenames
The Park-McCullough Historic House, where Trenor Park and (after his death) Governor McCullough lived, was listed on the National Register of Historic Places in 1972.

The John G. McCullough Free Library in North Bennington, Vermont, was built by McCullough's widow, Eliza McCullough, in memory of her husband. The two-story brick building was designed by the firm of Renwick, Aspinwall and Tucker, and opened on August 24, 1921.

References

External links
Governor John G. McCullough Records, 1902–1904. Vermont State Archives.
Park-McCullough House, North Bennington, Vermont

1835 births
1915 deaths
American people of Welsh descent
Members of the California State Assembly
California Attorneys General
Republican Party governors of Vermont
Republican Party Vermont state senators
Presidents pro tempore of the Vermont Senate
Vermont lawyers
American Congregationalists
19th-century American railroad executives
University of Delaware alumni
University of Pennsylvania Law School alumni
People from Bennington, Vermont
Norwich University alumni
People from Newark, Delaware
Burials in Vermont
19th-century American politicians
19th-century American lawyers